The Fourteenth Assembly of Tamil Nadu was constituted after the victory of All India Anna Dravida Munnetra Kazhagam (AIADMK) and allies, in the 2011 state assembly election. J. Jayalalitha became the Chief Minister of Tamil Nadu due to the election.

Overview 
Source: Tamil Nadu Legislative Assembly website

Members
Panneerselvam became the finance minister in Jayalalitha's third Cabinet.

See also 
Government of Tamil Nadu
Legislature of Tamil Nadu

References 

Tamil Nadu Legislative Assembly